Drstivāda is a legendary lost text in the Jain religion.  It is the last of the 12 Jain āgamas as per Śvetámbara tradition, said to be promulgated by Māhavīra himself and composed by Ganadhara Sudharmaswami. Drstivāda, translated as “Disputation about views”, was said to contain the entire knowledge of the Fourteen Purvas or prior knowledge that is now considered to be totally lost, in part because the tradition holds that the Drstivāda itself is also completely lost. However, its contents have been referred and explained in Nandi and Samavāyānga Sūtra.

Subject Matter of the Agama
Dristivāda was divided into five parts :-
Parikarma 
Sūtra 
Pūrvanayoga 
Purvgata 
Chūlikā

Parikarma contained Jaina calculatory science and the Sutra included discussions about creeds and doctrines. Pūrvanayoga contained Puranic narratives, religious biographies as well as illustrative tales. Purvagata contained fourteen subdivisions and contained discussions about Jaina doctrines and principles. As the name suggests, Purvas contain the knowledge prior to Mahavira which was preserved only in oral form. 
 

Jain texts
Agamas